Lady Bullseye (Maki Matsumoto) is a supervillainess appearing in American comic books published by Marvel Comics. A female counterpart of Bullseye, she was created by Ed Brubaker, Marko Djurdjevic, and Clay Mann, first appearing in Daredevil #111. She has primarily been an opponent of the superhero Daredevil.

Originally inspired to become a trained assassin when she witnessed Bullseye easily kill a number of people, she would later become a member of the Hand, although she did not hold their traditions in high esteem. Her alter ego is a lawyer, opposing Matt Murdock in the courtroom, thereby attacking Daredevil on two fronts. Lady Bullseye's true intentions were to take control of the Hand clan, but instead Daredevil becomes their leader.

Reiko Aylesworth voiced the Maki Matsumoto incarnation of Lady Bullseye in the Hulu streaming television series Hit-Monkey, while Olivia Munn voiced Akiko Yokohama, a new incarnation and the self-declared nemesis of Hit-Monkey.

Publication history
Lady Bullseye debuted in Daredevil #111 and was created by Ed Brubaker, Marko Djurdjevic, and Clay Mann. She was inspired by Lady Snowblood, a Japanese femme fatale.

Fictional character biography
Born in Japan, the young girl (it has not been revealed whether Maki Matsumoto is her birth name or an assumed one) who would become Lady Bullseye was imprisoned by the Yakuza, who planned to sell her and many others into sexual slavery. However, Bullseye, on an unrelated errand, arrived to slaughter the mobsters. The sight of Bullseye effortlessly killing her captors inspired the girl to escape and become a killer.

Years later, in the employ of the famous ninja order The Hand, she arrives in New York City to spearhead The Hand ninja-lord Hiroshi's plan. However, she has demonstrated little tolerance for The Hand's ritual, interrupting some (who are used to those traditions) off-guard in order to kill her enemies. She kills and resurrects both White Tiger and Black Tarantula to assist her.

At the same time, it has been revealed that in her civilian guise she is a lawyer, targeting Daredevil by assisting the parents of Murdock's mentally-ill wife Milla Donovan in gaining custody of her. When one of her associates discovers this, she kills him to prevent the Hand from learning the truth. Hiroshi claims that all she has done has been according to his will. Lady Bullseye offers Daredevil the leadership of the Hand, which he refuses. The organization regroups to Spain, preparing to initiate "Plan B". There, she finds Kingpin, trying to live a normal civilian life, and kills his new girlfriend and her kids, and brutally stabbing Kingpin, telling him that this is a message for Matt Murdock.

It turns out that Matsumoto's real goal was to take the leadership of the Hand herself, something she had been promised by Daredevil's ally Master Izo, who was revealed to have trained her. However, Izo was lying, and instead intended for Daredevil himself to take that post and reform the Hand. This occurring, Daredevil had Lady Bullseye cast out of the Hand for being untrustworthy. Angry, she vowed to kill Izo.

Lady Bullseye is shown to now be allied with the Kingpin against Daredevil, instigating a conflict between Daredevil and Norman Osborn, which ultimately leads to Daredevil declaring Hell's Kitchen the territory of the Hand.

Lady Bullseye was hired by an as yet unknown party to injure Pepper Potts with a compressed air rifle.

During the "Secret Empire" storyline, Lady Bullseye appears as a member of the Army of Evil and took part in the attack on Manhattan in retaliation for what happened at Pleasant Hill.

Lady Bullseye later appears as a member of Octavia Vermis' Anti-Arach9.

Powers and abilities
Lady Bullseye has no apparent superhuman powers, but is a master of several martial arts and a proficient hand-to-hand combatant, and specializes in using katana and shuriken. She is faster than Bullseye and less powerful than the Kingpin. Regardless, she has defeated Daredevil and Black Widow on separate occasions, and nearly defeated Daredevil on another occasion. Daredevil has commented that in her costumed form she has little scent and a very level pulse, akin to one performing yoga. She is also skilled in legal matters, being a lawyer in her civilian guise.

Reception

Accolades
 In 2009, IGN included Lady Bullseye in their "Marvel's Femme Fatales" list.
 In 2017, CBR.com ranked Lady Bullseye 10th in their "Daredevil's 15 Deadliest Villains" list and 12th in their "Marvel's 15 Best Martial Artists" list.
 In 2021, Screen Rant included Lady Bullseye in their "10 Most Powerful Villains Of Kate Bishop's Hawkeye" list.
 In 2022, WhatCulture ranked Lady Bullseye 2nd in their "10 Villains We Hope To See In Daredevil: Born Again" list.
 In 2022, Screen Rant included Lady Bullseye in their "Daredevil's Main Comic Book Villains, Ranked Lamest To Coolest" list, in their "10 Best Street Level Villains That Need To Debut In The MCU" list and in their "10 Best Daredevil Comics Characters Not In The MCU" list.

In other media
The Maki Matsumoto incarnation of Lady Bullseye appears in Hit-Monkey, voiced by Reiko Aylesworth. She is hired by Bonsai Master on Shinji Yokohama's behalf to kill the eponymous Hit-Monkey after he decimates the Yakuza while seeking vengeance for his tribe's slaughter. Initially dismissive of the job, she develops a vendetta against Hit-Monkey after he slices her cheek. Upon learning he is being assisted by the ghost of Bryce Fowler, a former associate of hers, she attempts to use salt to hurt him, but inadvertently grants him temporary corporeality, allowing him to help police officer Haruka kill her. After Hit-Monkey kills Yokohama, the latter's niece and the former's ex-friend, Akiko Yokohama (voiced by Olivia Munn), takes Matsumoto's mask and Lady Bullseye mantle, declaring herself Hit-Monkey's nemesis.

References

External links

 
 
Her profile in the Appendix to the Marvel Handbook

Characters created by Ed Brubaker
Comics characters introduced in 2008
Fictional assassins in comics
Fictional female assassins
Fictional lawyers
Fictional murderers
Fictional female ninja
Fictional Japanese people
Fictional women soldiers and warriors
Marvel Comics female supervillains
Marvel Comics martial artists